Restoration was a set of BBC television series where viewers decided on which listed building that was in immediate need of remedial works was to win a grant from Heritage Lottery Fund. It first aired in 2003.

The host of all three series was Griff Rhys Jones, whilst investigating each building in the heats were the show's resident "ruin detectives", Marianne Suhr and Ptolemy Dean.

First series
Thirty buildings featured in ten regional heats in 2003, with money raised from the telephone vote being added to the prize fund. Viewers chose which of a selection of the United Kingdom's most important, but neglected, buildings should be awarded a Heritage Lottery Grant of £3m. The winning building was the turkish-bath section of the Victoria Baths in Manchester; however, bureaucratic and technical hurdles meant that the money raised could not be spent immediately, and final planning-approval to begin a restoration process did not go through until September 2005. The first phase of restoration work finally began on 19 March 2007.

Kate Humble co-hosted the 2003 live grand final.

Second series
A second series, featuring 21 buildings in 7 regional heats, appeared on BBC Two in the summer of 2004. The winner was the Old Grammar School and Saracen's Head in Kings Norton, Birmingham. Both buildings closed to the public in July 2006 for archeological investigation, restoration work began in February 2007.  Both buildings were officially reopened on 13 June 2008.

The 2004 live Grand Final was co-hosted by Natasha Kaplinsky.

Spin offs
Shown in tandem with the series
Restored to Glory, BBC Four
Restoration Nation, BBC Four
Restoration: You Make It Happen, Community Channel

Updates
On 4 September 2005, Rhys Jones presented a programme, updating viewers as to the progress made by the featured buildings, or otherwise.

Third series
A third series of nine programmes, presented by Griff Rhys Jones, began on BBC Two in August 2006. Entitled Restoration Village, the series focused on buildings in smaller settlements, using the same format and voting as before, featuring 21 buildings in 7 regional heats. Updates about previously featured buildings were also included. The winner of Restoration Village was Chedham's Yard, an early 19th-century blacksmith's yard.

Updates
On 22 April 2009, Rhys Jones presented "Restoration Revisited", a 60-minute programme updating viewers as to the progress made by some of the 72 featured buildings throughout the three TV series.

The Perfect Village

The Perfect Village was a companion series of architectural travelogues presented by Ptolemy Dean, and shown on BBC Four in 2006. The show chose twelve villages from all around the United Kingdom as illustrations of village life. In the final show Heighington in County Durham was chosen as the UK's "perfect village".

 Show 1. Introduction
 Show 2. Dedham and Alderley Edge (Essex and the North West)
 Show 3. Bourton-on-the-Water and Ardglass (The West and Northern Ireland)
 Show 4. Rogart and Tonyrefail (Scotland and South Wales)
 Show 5. Heighington and Milton Abbas (the North and the South West)
 Shpw 6. Polperro and Wye (the South West and the South East)
 Show 7. Silver End and Poundbury (the East and the South West)
 Show 8. What makes the perfect village?

Responses
The Channel 4 programme, Demolition, broadcast in December 2005, was an "answer" to Restoration; instead of voting for a building to be saved, viewers were asked to vote on which eyesore should be demolished.

Music 
 The main theme music was composed by Nick Franglen, who forms one half of ambient music duo Lemon Jelly. The Lemon Jelly track "In The Bath" was used as background music within the programmes.

See also 
 List of Restoration candidates

References

External links
Restoration at bbc.co.uk
Restoration Village at bbc.co.uk
Episodes listing by TV.com (series 1 & 2 only)

2003 British television series debuts
2009 British television series endings
BBC television documentaries about history
Television shows about British architecture
Historic preservation
Television series by Endemol
Television series produced at Pinewood Studios
2000s British documentary television series
English-language television shows